Near-death experience refers to a broad range of personal experiences associated with impending death.

Near Death Experience or Near Death may also refer to:
 Near Death (comics), a comic book by Jay Faerber
 Near Death Experience (Cro-Mags album)
 Near Death Experience (Spektr album)
 Near Death Experience (film), a French drama film
 Near Death Experience, the original name of the British metal band One Minute Silence
 "Near Death Experience", the 2005 Summer Special episode of the British TV detective series A Touch of Frost
 A situation where death is narrowly avoided; see near miss (safety)

See also 
 About to Die, an EP by Dirty Projectors
 Death row
 End-of-life care
 Last Rites
 Lethal (disambiguation)
 Life review
 Morituri (disambiguation)
 Out-of-body experience
 Terminal illness